Philip Ryan Slattery (February 25, 1893 – March 2, 1968) was a pitcher in Major League Baseball. He played for the Pittsburgh Pirates in 1915.

References

External links

1893 births
1968 deaths
Major League Baseball pitchers
Pittsburgh Pirates players
Baseball players from Iowa
Des Moines Boosters players
Marshalltown Ansons players
South Bend Benders players
Peoria Distillers players
Grand Rapids Black Sox players
Vernon Tigers players
Beaumont Exporters players
Jackson Mayors players
Ionia Mayors players
People from Keokuk County, Iowa